John Hargreaves may refer to:
John Hargreaves (businessman) (born 1944), founder of British discount retailer Matalan
John Hargreaves (actor) (1945–1996), Australian actor
John Hargreaves (Australian Capital Territory politician) (born 1949), member of the Australian Capital Territory Legislative Assembly
John Hargreaves (Queensland politician) (1839–1907), member of the Queensland Legislative Assembly
John Hargreaves (cricketer) (born 1944), English cricketer
John Hargreaves (footballer) (1860–1903), England international footballer
John D. Hargreaves (1924–2015), professor of history at the University of Aberdeen
John Hargreaves (carrier) (1780–1860), English carrier and businessman
John Hargreaves (early railway operator) (1800–1874), English carrier, railway entrepreneur and manufacturing businessman
John Hargreaves (snooker player) (born 1945), English snooker player

See also 
Jack Hargreaves (1911–1994), British author and television presenter
John Hargrave (disambiguation)